"Try" is a song by Australian pop group Pseudo Echo. The song was released in September 1986 as the fourth and final single from the Australian release of their second studio album, Love an Adventure (1985). The song peaked at number 60 on the Australian Kent Music Report.

Track listings 
7" (EMI-1807) 
Side A "Try" - 4:16
Side B "Lonely Without You" - 4:33

Charts

References 

1985 songs
1986 singles
Pseudo Echo songs